David Rabeeya (May 12, 1938 - February 18, 2022) was an Israeli-American author and professor of Hebrew and Judaic Studies.

David Rabeeya was an Iraqi Jew born in Baghdad, Iraq. He and his family moved to Israel in 1951. In 1970, he moved to the United States. Dr. Rabeeya taught students at the high school, university, and elementary school levels.  As a prolific author, Dr. Rabeeya wrote books on various subjects, focusing on the Middle East and the relationship between Jews and other groups.

Books 
 America: Criticize It But Stay
 The Journey of an Arab-Jew: Through the American Maze
 Baghdadi Treasures: Challenging Ideas & Humorous Sayings
 Israel: Stripped Bare
 Women's Struggles; Women's Dreams
 Rabeeya's Reflections: Love, Sex and Wit
 Sephardic Lolita: Judeo-Arabic Restoration And Reconciliation
 Fruma: Caught in Her Web
 A Humanistic Siddur of Spirituality And Meaning: The American Character; We Rationalize Everything
 1,001 Jokes About Rabbis: And The Rest Of The World
 Afifah: A Bedouin Odyssey
 Fundamentalism: Roots, Causes and Implications
 Zionism: Final Call
 Homosexuals under Sharia Law
 Visionary Memoir
 Quarter in Half Time
 The Journey of an Arab-Jew in European Israel
 A Guide to Understanding Judaism and Islam: More Similarities Than differences
 Sephardic Recipes: Delicacies from Baghdad

References 

1938 births
Living people
American people of Iraqi-Jewish descent
Israeli people of Iraqi-Jewish descent
Writers from Baghdad
Iraqi emigrants to Israel
Israeli Arab Jews
Israeli emigrants to the United States
American non-fiction writers